Francis Irby Gwaltney (9 September 1921 in Traskwood, Arkansas – 27 February 1981) was a prolific Southern American author. He was the most well known author to have set his books in Arkansas.

Biography
After his father, Dr. Boulanger Gwaltney (M.D.), died, Gwaltney was raised in Charleston, Arkansas.

During World War II, he served with the 112th Cavalry in the Philippines Campaign (1944–45) where he met Norman Mailer.

Returning to Arkansas after the war, Gwaltney obtained his high school diploma, then earned a degree in English from the University of Arkansas. He married Emma Carolyn Calhoun on 19 AUG 1947, earned a Masters in English in 1950 and taught at various schools.

He wrote his first novel The Yeller-Headed Summer with help of his war buddy, Norman Mailer. His most famous novel based on his war experiences was The Day the Century Ended that was filmed as Between Heaven and Hell.

Gwaltney wrote teleplays for Alfred Hitchcock Presents and The Fugitive.

Works
 The Yeller-Headed Summer (1954)
 The Whole Town Knew (1955)
 The Day the Century Ended (1955)
 A Moment Of Warmth (1957)
 Historic Washington, Arkansas: A Survey (1958)
 The Numbers of Our Days (1959)
 A Step in the River: A Novel/The Violators (1960)
 Consent and Desire (1962)
 The Quicksand Years (1965)
 Destiny's Chickens (1973)
 Idols and Axle Grease (1974)

Notes

External links

 Francis Gwaltney in the Encyclopedia of Arkansas http://encyclopediaofarkansas.net/encyclopedia/entry-detail.aspx?entryID=3034

1921 births
1981 deaths
20th-century American novelists
American male novelists
United States Army personnel of World War II
United States Army soldiers
Writers from Arkansas
American male screenwriters
People from Charleston, Arkansas
People from Saline County, Arkansas
20th-century American male writers
Screenwriters from Arkansas
20th-century American screenwriters
American expatriates in the Philippines